Andrew Stewart (January 18, 1904 – July 14, 1990) was a Canadian academic and economist.

Early life 
Stewart was born in Scotland and educated at the East of Scotland College of Agriculture and University of Manitoba.

Career 
Stewart served as president of the University of Alberta from 1950 to 1959. Stewart was previously a professor of political economy, director of the school of commerce, and dean of business affairs at the university. From 1959 to 1969, he was chair of the Board of Broadcast Governors (predecessor to the Canadian Radio-television and Telecommunications Commission), and served in this capacity as host of the 14th Canadian Film Awards in 1962. He was also one of the founders of the University of Ibadan in Nigeria.

References

External links 
University of Alberta biography

Presidents of the University of Alberta
1904 births
1990 deaths
Academics from Edinburgh
Alumni of Scotland's Rural College
University of Manitoba alumni